Son of a Pimp Part 2 is the fifth studio album by American rapper Mistah F.A.B. from Oakland, California. It was released on May 27, 2016 via Faeva Afta/EMPIRE. Production was handled by several record producers, including Iamsu!, Jake One, Pete Rock, P-Lo, Sean T, and Tha Bizness among others. It also features guest appearances by the likes of 2 Chainz, B.o.B, Bobby V, Bun B, Carl Thomas, Crooked I, Devin the Dude, E-40, Fashawn, G-Eazy, J. Stalin, Jadakiss, Keak da Sneak, Kendrick Lamar, Keyshia Cole, Kobe, Lil' Boosie, Lupe Fiasco, Curren$y, Paul Wall, Raekwon, Schoolboy Q, Slim Thug, Snoop Dogg, Tech N9NE, The Jacka, Too $hort, and Z-Ro among others. The album peaked at number 24 on the US Billboard Top R&B/Hip-Hop Albums, number 16 on the Top Rap Albums, number 22 on the Independent Albums, number 3 on the Heatseekers Albums. This album is a follow-up to the rapper's 2005 album Son of a Pimp.

Track listing

Charts

References 

2016 albums
Mistah F.A.B. albums
Sequel albums
Albums produced by Jake One
Albums produced by Pete Rock
Albums produced by Tha Bizness
Empire Distribution albums